Munnycat (MUNNYCAT) is an American Indie pop duo from Los Angeles formed in 2016. The band consists of Katianne Timko, nicknamed "K808", and Khaled Tabbara, nicknamed "Khaledzou". Timko and Tabbara are responsible for vocals and production and often add musicians at their live shows. The band defines their genre as noise pop and takes a DIY approach to their music.

The band is perhaps best known for their success in commercial syncs. Their music has been placed over 100 times by companies like EA Sports’ FIFA 19, New Balance, Wendy’s, eBay, Xbox, JCPenney and Target.

History
Timko and Tabbara first met in Youngstown, Ohio in 2011 after Timko booked Tabbara's band to perform at a St. Patrick’s Day event. The two began dating later that year, and joined each other's musical projects soon after. They moved to Los Angeles in 2016, where they formed Munnycat. They currently reside in Studio City, LA.

Munnycat released an EP entitled, Platinum Gold , in April 2017. They release singles on a regular basis, including "don’t stop (drip drip drop)" in March 2019, which made it to #1 on Hype Machine and landed at #4 for the week of April 1–7.  Their song "Platinum Gold" was featured in Coca-Cola's first advertising campaign for AHA sparkling water, which launched in March 2020.  On July 25, 2021, they released "so fresh" from their upcoming mixtape titled "the MUNNYCAT mixtape" which released on August 25, 2021.

Discography
2021: so fresh
2020: Howya Like Me Now?
2020: FULL BRONTO
2019: MILLIONAIRE (jz + bncé)
 2019: don't stop (drip drip drop)
 2019: Go-Go A-Go-Go
 2018: Check It
 2018: Piranha
 2018: Level Up! (La Da Di)
 2018: You + Me
 2018: BOOM!

the MUNNYCAT mixtape (2021) 
 "unshaken in the final moment of chaos"
 "eyes on this"
 "do yer own thing (please)"
 "easy"
 "khaledzou is president"
"so fresh"
"here it isss"

Platinum Gold EP (2017) 

 "Platinum Gold"
 "Just Watch Me"
 "Feelin Alive"
 "Make a Move"
 "Tonight"

References

American musical duos
Indie pop groups from Los Angeles
Noise pop musical groups
Hip hop groups from California
American noise rock music groups
Indie pop groups from Ohio
Musical groups established in 2016
Rock music duos
Electronic music groups from California
American electronic dance music groups
Electronic music groups from Ohio
Electronic music duos
Male–female musical duos
2016 establishments in California